Saint-Narcisse is a 2020 Canadian comedy-drama film, directed by Bruce LaBruce. Set in Quebec in 1972, the film stars Félix-Antoine Duval as a pair of identical twins who were separated at birth and did not previously know of each other's existence, but who fall in love and begin a twincest relationship with each other after being reunited.

The cast also includes Tania Kontoyanni, Alexandra Petrachuck, Andreas Apergis and Angèle Coutu.

The film was produced by 1976 Productions and Six Island Productions. It had financial backing from CBC Films, Telefilm, and SODEC.

The film premiered in the Venice Days stream at the 77th Venice International Film Festival. It will be distributed by Best Friend Forever internationally, and by Northern Banner Entertainment (a part of Raven Banner Entertainment) and AZ Films in Canada.

References

External links
 
 

2020 films
2020 LGBT-related films
Canadian comedy-drama films
Canadian LGBT-related films
LGBT-related black comedy films
LGBT-related comedy-drama films
Films shot in Quebec
Films directed by Bruce LaBruce
Incest in film
2020 comedy-drama films
Films about twin brothers
2020s Canadian films